Antoinette Sabrier is a 1927 French silent drama film directed by Germaine Dulac and starring Ève Francis, Gabriel Gabrio and Jean Toulout.

The film's art direction was by Louis Nalpas.

Cast
 Ève Francis as Antoinette Sabrier  
 Gabriel Gabrio as Germain Sabrier  
 Jean Toulout as Jamagne  
 Yvette Armel as Hélène Doreuil 
 Paul Guidé as Roger Dangenne  
 Paul Menant as Chartrain  
 Paul Cervières as Gaston Doreuil  
 Ashida as Le danseur 
 Lou Davy

References

Bibliography 
 Dayna Oscherwitz & MaryEllen Higgins. The A to Z of French Cinema. Scarecrow Press, 2009.

External links 
 

1927 films
French silent films
1920s French-language films
Films directed by Germaine Dulac
Pathé films
French drama films
1927 drama films
French black-and-white films
Silent drama films
1920s French films